Maharaja Ranjit Singh (2 May 1745 – 6 December 1805) was the ruling Maharaja of the princely state of Bharatpur (r.1778–1805) and successor of Maharaja Kehri Singh, he was bestowed by the title of Farzand Jang meaning Son of War by the Mughal Emperor Shah Alam II. He participated in the Second Anglo-Maratha War on the side of the Marathas and his forces proved a tough match for Lord Lake.

Biography
Jawahar Singh had no son's he was succeeded by his brother Ratan Singh, Who murdered in 1769, Nawal Singh seized Bharatpur, while Ranjit Singh occupied Kumbhar, Nawal Singh invaded Kumbhar, Ranjit Singh called in the Sikhs for help, Sikh then set out to help Ranjit Singh. They arrived near Aligarh in January 1770, Nawal Singh marched to oppose them, The rumours of Sikhs ferocity so terrified him that he fled away without even meeting them, the Sikh pursued him plundering and ravaging all the way,

In 1805, war between the Britishers and the Holkar broke out. Maharaja Ranjit Singh of Bharatpur agreed to help the Yashwant Rao Holkar and the two Maharajas fell back to the Bharatpur fort. The British surrounded the fort and after three months, Ranjit Singh agreed to peace and signed a treaty with the British, thus becoming a princely state.

See also 

 Siege of Bharatpur (1805)

References 

Rulers of Bharatpur state
Jat rulers
Jat
1745 births
1805 deaths